The Bishop of Richmond may refer to:

 The Bishop of Richmond (suffragan), Church of England bishop.
 The Bishop of the Roman Catholic Diocese of Richmond, United States.